Löfbergs, named Löfbergs Lila until 2012, is a coffee roastery in Karlstad, Sweden. It was founded in 1906 by the three brothers Josef, Anders and John Löfberg.

Löfbergs is today one of the largest coffee roasteries in the Nordic countries. The company is still family owned and is now in third and fourth generation. The main office and one of the roasteries is in Karlstad. They own 50% of Peter Larsens Kaffe in Viborg, Denmark. Löfbergs also owns Kobbs tea. The company has 200 employees. As of 1999 the company had a 20% market share in Sweden.
 
In recent years Löfbergs have strengthened their position in the market, with an emphasis on social responsibility and working for a better environment. Löfbergs is one of Europe's largest importers of organic and fair trade coffee, as well as being Sweden's major supplier of coffee to restaurants, cafés and companies.

Löfbergs sponsors the ice hockey team Färjestad BK as well as Löfbergs Arena. For many years, Färjestad's team colours were the same purple and yellow as Löfbergs's colours, but that was changed for the 2006–07 season.

In August 2012, the roastery dropped "Lila" from its name to become Löfbergs.

References

External links
Löfbergs official website

See also 
 

Coffee brands
Food and drink companies of Sweden
Food and drink companies established in 1906
Swedish brands
Purveyors to the Court of Sweden
Companies based in Värmland County
Swedish companies established in 1906